Anything But Straight: Unmasking the Scandals and Lies Behind the Ex-Gay Myth is a 2003 book by Wayne Besen, a gay rights advocate. The book examines the claims of prominent gay "conversion therapists" and provides insight into "ex-gay" ministries such as Love in Action, Exodus International, Homosexuals Anonymous.

The book received a positive review from American psychiatrist Jack Drescher, known for his work on sexual orientation and gender identity.

References

External links
Anything But Straight
Wayne Besen

2003 non-fiction books
American non-fiction books
English-language books
LGBT literature in the United States
2000s LGBT literature
Harrington Park Press books